Sam Summerlin (January 1, 1928 – February 27, 2017) was an American journalist, author and foreign correspondent. He was best known for his time as an Associated Press correspondent from 1949 to 1975. On July 27, 1953, while working as an AP war correspondent, Summerlin became the first journalist to report on the signing of the Korean Armistice Agreement which ended the Korean War.

He was born in Chapel Hill, North Carolina, on January 1, 1928. He received his bachelor's degree from the University of North Carolina before joining the staff of the Associated Press as a journalist in 1949. In 1951, the AP sent him to cover the Korean War as a foreign correspondent when he was 23-years old, becoming one of the youngest journalists to cover the conflict.

Summerlin left the Associated Press in 1975 to take the position of president and chairman of the news service and syndicate at the New York Times. He also authored several books, including The China Cloud and Latin America: Land of Revolution.

Sam Summerlin died from complications of Parkinson's disease at a nursing home in Carlsbad, California, on February 27, 2017, at the age of 89.

References

1928 births
2017 deaths
Associated Press reporters
The New York Times corporate staff
American war correspondents
University of North Carolina alumni
People from Chapel Hill, North Carolina
Journalists from North Carolina
American male journalists
20th-century American journalists